

The OMAC Laser 300, originally named the OMAC I was a business aircraft built in the United States in 1981 but which never reached production.

Design 
It was a highly unusual design, with a canard layout, a pusher-mounted turboprop engine, and a high, cantilever, swept wing carrying endplate-type fins at its tips. Construction was of metal throughout. The cabin could seat six-seven passengers, but incorporated quick-change seats, allowing rapid conversion to carrying light freight. Early in development, plans existed to produce a turbofan-powered version of the design, but this did not happen.

Development
The first prototype flew on 11 December 1981 and OMAC ("Old Man's Aircraft Company") initially hoped to obtain type certification by mid 1982. These efforts were delayed by an accident on the ground, and then a landing accident caused by the failure of a locking pin on the undercarriage. A second prototype took to the air on 19 February 1983, and certification was expected "no later than December 1984". Late in 1983, however, the certification process was still only in its preliminary stages.

In the mid-1980s, the Laser 300 program became one of the first projects carried out cooperatively by NASA and private industry when a joint team used the Langley 12-Foot Low-Speed Tunnel to investigate the stability and control characteristics of the unusual design. Special attention was paid to behavior at high angles of attack and to stall and spin resistance. The results were unfavorable, indicating poor longitudinal stability at high angles of attack. The wing design was modified to address this problem, with an extension added to the trailing edge flap, and a discontinuous, leading edge droop added to the outboard section of the wings. Stall characteristics were found to be good, however, since the canard was found to provide a nose-down pitching moment at the point of a stall. These changes were tested on the second prototype before the design was frozen in April 1985. Additionally, production machines were to have a redesigned fuselage of round cross-section, a redesigned nose, and additional baggage compartments.

Meanwhile, OMAC relocated from its original home in Reno, Nevada to Albany, Georgia in January 1985, as an agreement had been reached with Ayres Corporation to undertake the manufacture of the aircraft at the firm's Albany plant. Certification was now anticipated by mid-1986. By late 1986, a third prototype was under construction at Ayres, incorporating the refinements that had been tested on the second machine. This machine was being constructed alongside three other Laser 300s, together representing the first four of thirty aircraft that Omac hoped to build by the end of 1987. The third prototype (and first production machine) flew on 29 July 1987 and certification was now expected by May 1988. By now, production of the redesigned Laser 300 was running one year behind schedule, and the projected cost of the airplane had risen from $US 550,000 to $875,000, albeit for a more capable aircraft. The aircraft was displayed at the NBAA show in Dallas, Texas in October 1988, by which time 56 hours of flight testing had been carried out without incident. Certification was now expected by the end of 1989 or early 1990.

By February 1989, however, $20 million was required to fund certification and initial production, with OMAC hoping to have certification in place by May and 17 aircraft delivered by the end of the year at a cost of $975,000 per aircraft. In the event, finance was not forthcoming, and the program stalled at this point, although Omac continued to offer the aircraft as late as 1993, along with an improved version designated the Laser 360.

Specifications (prototype)

See also

References
Notes

Bibliography
 
 
 
 
 
 
 
 
 
 
 
 
 
 
 
 
 
 
 
 

Ayres aircraft
Canard aircraft
Abandoned civil aircraft projects of the United States
1980s United States business aircraft
Single-engined pusher aircraft
High-wing aircraft
Single-engined turboprop aircraft
Aircraft first flown in 1981